Asarwa Chakla is an area located in Ahmedabad, India. It is located south of the Civil Hospital and east of the Sabarmati river. Chakla literally means as the central meeting place in Gujarati. Asarwa Chakla is a roundabout formed by the north and south Hanuman singh road, Nilkhant Mahadev road, and an unnamed residential road. The Asarwa Chakla post office is located on the south side of the Hanuman singh road. There are many small shops and restaurants within the Asarwa Chakla. Most of them serve paan, which contains betel nut and is linked to Oral Cancer.

List of Restaurants & Shops 
 Gurumukh Paan Center.
 Jay Ambe Dairy.
 Lucky Paan Center.
 New Umiya Bhajiya Mart.
 Shiv Shakti Chawana & Sweets.
 Sultan (Jay) Pan Parlour

References

Neighbourhoods in Ahmedabad